Nyika (Nyiha) is a Bantu language of Tanzania and Zambia.

References

Rukwa languages
Languages of Tanzania